The 2023 NTT IndyCar Series is the 112th official championship season of American open wheel racing and the 28th season under IndyCar Series sanction. The showcase event will be the 2023 Indianapolis 500.

Background and series news
Will Power of Team Penske entered the series as the reigning drivers' champion, having won the title at the final round in Laguna Seca by 16 points over his teammate Josef Newgarden. Defending Indianapolis 500 winner Marcus Ericsson entered 2023 in a contract year for Chip Ganassi Racing. In February 2023, 2013 Indianapolis 500 winner and 2004 IndyCar Series champion Tony Kanaan announced that he would retire from IndyCar after the Indianapolis 500.

The 2023 season saw several marketing changes intended to increase domestic viewership of the series. On December 8, 2022, the CW Network announced a reality documentary series titled "100 Days to Indy," which would premiere on April 27, 2023. Produced by Vice Media, Penske Entertainment president Mark Miles noted that Penske Entertainment would receive some monetary compensation in return for facilitating behind-the-scenes access. In February 2023 it was confirmed that the series organizer, Penske Entertainment Corp., planned for a marketing budget of approximately US$17 million focusing on 20 markets deemed important by series leadership. In February 2023, it was reported by Marshall Pruett of Racer.com that the annual Leader's Circle contracts earned by entries which compete in the full season would be reduced by $150,000 each to a value of $910,000. The money was allocated towards the Series' marketing budget.

In addition to these changes by the series, new sponsorships were announced including that Shell USA would replace Speedway LLC as an official fuel partner and supplier, with the series introducing a 100% renewable fuel.

On February 2, 2023, the championship's sanctioning body announced that the Indianapolis 500 would no longer be a double points-paying race, ending a rule that was first established in 2014.

In addition to criticism about series marketing faced after the 2022 season, Penske Entertainment faced criticism when 2022 Indy Lights champion Linus Lundqvist was unable to obtain a seat for the 2023 IndyCar season. In response to this, PEC added $350,000 to the champions advancement prize for the now-renamed 2023 Indy NXT.

The series' tire supplier Firestone announced the expanded use of tires made from guayule rubber as the "alternate" tire (which must be used for at least two green-flag laps every race) for all street circuit races. The 2023 season was scheduled to be the final season using the current 2.2-litre V6 twin-turbocharged engine formula that made its debut in the 2012 season. A new 2.4-litre V6 twin-turbocharged hybrid engine formula was meant to debut in the series from 2024 onwards. However, on December 6, 2022, it was announced that these plans would be put on hold and the hybrid technology will instead be implemented on the current 2.2-litre engines for 2024.

Confirmed entries
The following teams, entries, and drivers have been announced to compete in the 2023 NTT IndyCar Series season. All teams use a spec Dallara IR18 chassis with universal aero kit and Firestone tires.

Álex Palou contract dispute 
On July 12, 2022, Chip Ganassi Racing sent a press release saying that they had extended the contract of Álex Palou for the 2023 IndyCar season by exercising the option they held on his deal. Included in the press release was a quote attributed to Palou. Hours later, Palou, via a thread on Twitter denounced this press release, claimed that the quote attributed to him was created by the team (a practice common among IndyCar teams, according to RACER.com'''s Marshall Pruett) and also not approved by him. He also stated that he had given Chip Ganassi Racing prior notice that he intended to leave the team after the 2022 season and join McLaren Racing's roster of drivers. Moments after these tweets, McLaren announced that they had signed Palou to a contract for 2023, though it was not specifically mentioned if Palou would drive for Arrow McLaren SP, McLaren's IndyCar operation. Chip Ganassi Racing responded to this by releasing a statement reiterating their claim to Palou's services. On July 27, 2022, Chip Ganassi Racing confirmed they had filed a civil lawsuit against Palou in Marion County, Indiana. On September 14, 2022, it was announced that an agreement had been reached by all parties that would see Palou continue with Chip Ganassi for the 2023 season, and McLaren subsequently confirmed Felix Rosenqvist would be returning to AMSP.

Driver changes
Preseason

 On June 2, 2022, Arrow McLaren SP confirmed the signing of Alexander Rossi for 2023 in a third entry. He departed Andretti Autosport after seven years with the team.
 On June 6, 2022, Andretti Autosport announced that 2021 Indy Lights champion Kyle Kirkwood would replace Rossi in the No. 27 entry, switching from A.J. Foyt Racing.
 On September 26, 2022, Jimmie Johnson announced that he would step back from racing on a full-time basis. Johnson had competed full-time in the 2022 season for Chip Ganassi Racing.
 On September 28, 2022, A. J. Foyt Racing confirmed the signing of Benjamin Pedersen to a multi-year contract. The Danish-American moved up from Indy Lights where he finished 5th in the championship with 1 win in 2022.
 On October 6, 2022, A. J. Foyt Racing confirmed they had signed Santino Ferrucci to drive the No. 14 entry. Ferrucci spent 2022 driving in two races as an injury substitute, the Indianapolis 500 for Dreyer & Reinbold Racing, and two NASCAR Xfinity Series races.
 On October 11, 2022, Dalton Kellett announced that he would not be returning to A. J. Foyt Racing after three seasons with the team. Kellett had met with the team earlier to discuss running a third entry after the signing of Ferrucci and Pedersen.
 On November 1, 2022, Arrow McLaren SP confirmed that Tony Kanaan would drive a fourth entry for the team at the Indianapolis 500. Kanaan moves from Chip Ganassi Racing, where he finished 3rd in the race in 2022.
On November 17, 2022, Dreyer & Reinbold Racing announced that it had formed a partnership with Cusick Motorsports to field their driver Stefan Wilson in DRR's No. 24 entry in the Indianapolis 500. Wilson replaces Sage Karam, who ran the Indianapolis 500 the last seven years for DRR.
On December 2, 2022, Chip Ganassi Racing announced that they had signed Marcus Armstrong to race the road and street course races in its No. 11 entry. Armstrong moved over from Hitech Grand Prix in the FIA Formula 2 Championship, where he won 3 races in 2022. The entry replaced the No. 48 entry driven by Johnson. On January 17, 2023, Takuma Sato was announced to join CGR to drive in "oval competition", including the Indianapolis 500. He left Dale Coyne Racing after one season with the team. On March 3, 2023, The Indianapolis Star quoted a clarification by Ganassi that the deal with Sato was only in place for Texas and Indianapolis, with its presence at Iowa and Gateway "to be determined"
On January 18, 2023, Dale Coyne Racing with Rick Ware Racing confirmed 2022 Indy Lights runner-up Sting Ray Robb as Sato's replacement in the No. 51 entry.

Midseason
On March 15, 2023, Dreyer & Reinbold Racing announced that 2014 Indianapolis 500 winner Ryan Hunter-Reay will drive the No. 23 entry in the Indianapolis 500.

Team changes
Preseason
On September 7, 2022, Juncos Hollinger Racing announced that they would expand to two entries. On January 12, 2023, they confirmed Agustín Canapino as the full-time driver of the No. 78.
On September 20, 2022, Taylor Kiel announced that he was leaving his role as president of Arrow McLaren SP on his own volition with immediate effect.
On September 23, 2022, Arrow McLaren SP confirmed they had hired Brian Barnhart in a to-be-defined role. On October 4, the team announced Barnhart's role would be general manager, while also naming Gavin Ward to the position of race director, splitting the duties of former president Kiel. Barnhart departed Andretti Autosport after serving as race strategist for James Hinchcliffe and Alexander Rossi.
On October 31, 2022, Rahal Letterman Lanigan Racing co-owner Bobby Rahal told Racer.com's Marshall Pruett that the team will run a fourth entry at the Indianapolis 500. On February 9, 2023, the team confirmed that Katherine Legge will drive the No. 44 entry, making her first IndyCar Series appearance since 2013.
On November 15, 2022, Chip Ganassi Racing's managing director Mike Hull told Racer.com'''s Marshall Pruett that the team had hired Taylor Kiel (Hull's stepson) as team manager, filling a void left by promoting Mike O'Gara to run the team's sports car racing entries.
On November 23, 2022, Rahal Letterman Lanigan Racing announced a driver swap amongst their Nos. 30 and 45 entries. Christian Lundgaard would drive the No. 45 and Jack Harvey the No. 30 with the change being done for sponsorship reasons.
On December 12, 2022, Arrow McLaren SP announced a rebrand that would take effect for the 2023 season, removing the "SP" wordmark to become “Arrow McLaren”.
On January 19, 2023, A. J. Foyt Racing initially confirmed that Benjamin Pedersen would drive the No. 88 entry, having left out a number in Pedersen's confirmation announcement and choosing the number in honor of owner A. J. Foyt's 88th birthday. However on January 27, 2023, the team released a statement saying that Pedersen would drive the No. 55 after they were made aware of an ideological connotation to the combination of entries numbered "14" and "88".

Midseason

Schedule 
The schedule was released on September 27, 2022. In October 2022, IndyCar announced three open tests for the 2023 season.

NOTE: Race names are preliminary and subject to change

Season report

Results

Points standings 

 Ties are broken by number of wins, followed by number of 2nds, 3rds, etc.; then by finishing position in the previous race; then by random draw.

Driver standings 

 At all races except the Indy 500, the pole position qualifier earns 1 point (unless qualifying is not held). The twelve Indy 500 qualifiers who qualify for the fast 12 session receive points based on the results of that session, descending from 12 points for first place.
 Drivers who lead at least one race lap are awarded 1 point. The driver who leads the most laps during a race scores an additional 2 points.
 Entrant-initiated engine change-outs before the engine reaches their required distance run result in the loss of 10 points.

Entrant  standings 

 Each regular season entry that finished in the top 22 the previous season qualified for the Leaders Circle, the IndyCar programme which, among other things, awards each team in it around a $910,000 bonus for completing the races providing that car competes in the full season. The Leaders Circle payouts were reduced for the 2023 season.

See also 

 2023 Indy NXT
 2023 USF Pro 2000 Championship
 2023 USF2000 Championship
 2023 USF Juniors

Footnotes

References

Sources

External links
 

IndyCar Series
IndyCar Series seasons
IndyCar Series
IndyCar Series